The Ruboni Range is a mountain range in Papua New Guinea.

Various Ramu languages are spoken in the mountain range.

See also
Ruboni languages

References

Mountain ranges of Papua New Guinea